Kani Dinar (also Romanized as Kānī Dīnār; also known simply as Dīnār) is a city in the Central District of Marivan County, Kurdistan Province, Iran. At the 2006 census, its population was 5,127, in 1,232 families. The city is populated by Kurds.

References

Towns and villages in Marivan County
Cities in Kurdistan Province
Kurdish settlements in Kurdistan Province